The United Arab Emirates participated at the 16th Asian Games in Guangzhou, China.

Medalists

References

Nations at the 2010 Asian Games
2010
Asian Games